Events from the year 1817 in Scotland.

Incumbents

Law officers 
 Lord Advocate – Alexander Maconochie
 Solicitor General for Scotland – James Wedderburn

Judiciary 
 Lord President of the Court of Session – Lord Granton
 Lord Justice General – The Duke of Montrose
 Lord Justice Clerk – Lord Boyle

Events 
 25 January – The Scotsman is first published in Edinburgh as a liberal weekly newspaper by lawyer William Ritchie and customs official Charles Maclaren.
 1 March – suffocating fumes in the Leadhills lead mine kill seven.
 1 April – Blackwood's Magazine is launched as the Edinburgh Monthly Magazine, a Tory publication. In October the publisher, William Blackwood, relaunches it as Blackwood's Edinburgh Magazine.
 20 May – Royal Botanic Institution of Glasgow founded by Thomas Hopkirk and others to establish a Glasgow Botanic Garden.
 June – Union Canal authorised.
 10 July – David Brewster patents the kaleidoscope.
 15 October – school of whales seen in the Tay.
 November – Thomas Chalmers, in a sermon, appeals for a Christian effort to deal with the social condition of Glasgow.
 4 December – The Inverness Courier is first published as a newspaper by John and Christian Isobel Johnstone.
 Dingwall Canal completed.
 A typhus epidemic occurs in Edinburgh and Glasgow.
 Dufftown founded by James Duff, 4th Earl Fife, in Moray.
 St Andrew's Cathedral, Aberdeen, opened as St Andrew's Chapel within the Episcopal Church.
 Calton Gaol, Edinburgh, completed.
 Old Tolbooth, Edinburgh, demolished.
 Glasgow Botanic Gardens created.
 Corsewall Lighthouse, designed by Robert Stevenson, first illuminated.
 Thomas Telford's ferry piers at Invergordon and Inverbreakie are built.
 Bladnoch distillery founded by John and Thomas McClelland near Wigtown.
 Teaninich distillery founded by Hugh Munro at Alness.
 The post of Regius Professor of Chemistry at the University of Glasgow is established by King George III.
 Approximate date – the Kilmarnock and Troon Railway introduces into service The Duke, the first steam locomotive on a railway in Scotland.

Births 
 February – Samuel Morison Brown, chemist, poet and essayist (died 1856)
 15 February – Robert Angus Smith, atmospheric chemist (died 1884)
 28 February – Walter Hood Fitch, botanical artist (died 1892)
 9 April – Alexander Thomson, Greek Revival architect (died 1875)
 29 April – Adam White, zoologist (died 1878)
 17 May
 Thomas Davidson, palaeontologist (died 1885)
 John Ross, explorer (died 1903 in Australia)
 22 May – James Macaulay, physician and literary editor (died 1902)
 1 June – David Lyall, botanist (died 1895)
 16 June – Alexander Forbes, bishop of Brechin (died 1875)
 25 August – William Graham, wine merchant, art patron and Liberal politician (died 1885)
 8 September – Stephen Hislop, Free Church missionary and geologist (died 1863 in India)
 16 September – William Smith, architect (died 1891)
 21 September – John Allan Broun, magnetologist (died 1879)
 12 October – William Collins, publisher, Lord Provost of Glasgow and temperance activist (died 1895)
 17 October – Alexander Mitchell, banker, railroad financier and Democratic politician (died 1887 in the United States)
 29 October – Angus Macmillan, shipbuilder and politician on Prince Edward Island (died 1906 in Canada)
 4 December – Thomas Thomson, military surgeon and botanist (died 1878 in India)
 10 December – Alexander Wood, physician and inventor of the hypodermic syringe (died 1884)
 John Millar, Lord Craighill, Solicitor General (died 1888)
 Approximate date – Marion Kirkland Reid, feminist (died 1902?)

Deaths 
 8 February – Francis Horner, Whig politician, journalist, lawyer and political economist (born 1778; died in Italy)
 3 September – James Byres of Tonley, art dealer (born 1734)
 2 October – Alexander Monro, anatomist (born 1733)
 8 October – Henry Erskine, lawyer and Whig politician (born 1746)

The arts 
 19 September – the body of poet Robert Burns (died 1796) is moved to a new mausoleum in Dumfries.
 31 December – Walter Scott's novel Rob Roy is published anonymously.

See also 
 Timeline of Scottish history

References 

 
Scotland
Years of the 19th century in Scotland
1810s in Scotland